Jarosław Piotr Urbaniak (born 7 August 1966 in Ostrów Wielkopolski) is a Polish politician. He was elected to the Sejm on 25 September 2005, getting 7,400 votes in 36 Kalisz districts as a candidate from the Civic Platform list.

See also
Members of Polish Sejm 2005-2007

External links
Jarosław Urbaniak - parliamentary page - includes declarations of interest, voting record, and transcripts of speeches.

Civic Platform politicians
1966 births
Living people
Members of the Polish Sejm 2005–2007
Members of the Polish Sejm 2007–2011
Members of the Polish Sejm 2015–2019
Members of the Polish Sejm 2019–2023
John Paul II Catholic University of Lublin alumni
University of Warsaw alumni
Recipients of the Silver Cross of Merit (Poland)